The 2012–13 Central Michigan Chippewas men's basketball team represented Central Michigan University during the 2012–13 NCAA Division I men's basketball season. The Chippewas, led by first year head coach Keno Davis, played their home games at the McGuirk Arena and were members of the West Division of the Mid-American Conference. They finished the season 11–20, 4–12 in MAC play to finish in fifth place in the West Division. They lost in the first round of the MAC tournament to Buffalo.

Roster

Schedule

|-
!colspan=9| Exhibition

|-
!colspan=9| Regular season

|-
!colspan=9| 2013 MAC men's basketball tournament

References

Central Michigan Chippewas men's basketball seasons
Central Michigan